DeSalvio Playground is a neighborhood park located on the corner of Spring Street and Mulberry Street in NoLita, in Manhattan, New York City.

The playground has modular play equipment that is red, white, and green (in honor of the Italian flag), built-in stone chess tables, a basketball half-court, and benches.

History
The park honors John DeSalvio (1881–1948) and his son Louis DeSalvio (1910–2004). John DeSalvio, a first-generation American, served as  district leader of the Second Assembly District (West), and was one of a few Italian-Americans in the Tammany Hall political organization. Louis DeSalvio served as Second District New York State Assemblyman. The City of New York acquired the property in 1954 and turned it over to the Parks department. The playground opened on December 15, 1955 as "John DeSalvio Park".

The playground hosted the Citywide Bocce Ball Championships in 1996 and 1997.

References

External links
Friends of DeSalvio Playground

Playgrounds
1955 establishments in New York City
Parks in Manhattan
Nolita
Urban public parks